G. N. Rangarajan (17 December 1930 – 3 June 2021) was an Indian writer, producer and director who worked in Tamil cinema.

Film career 
Rangarajan was influenced by the works of director A. Bhimsingh, and joined editor Dorai Singam as an assistant in the late 1950s. An early film that he worked on was Bhimsingh's Kalathur Kannamma (1960), featuring a young Kamal Haasan in a starring role. He later became associated with director S. P. Muthuraman and writer Panchu Arunachalam for many films, early in his career. He worked as an associate director on films including Bhuvana Oru Kelvi Kuri (1977), Aarilirunthu Arubathu Varai (1979) and Priya (1978).

As a director, Rangarajan subsequently collaborated with Kamal Haasan on a number of successful films including Kalyanaraman (1979), Meendum Kokila (1981), Kadal Meengal (1981) and Ellam Inba Mayyam (1981) in a two-year period. Notably, he took over directorial duties from Mahendran during the making of Meendum Kokila on the insistence of Kamal Haasan. He later also wrote and produced films, notably making Aduthathu Albert (1985) and Sir... I Love You (1991). His final directorial Maharasan (1993), had Kamal Haasan in the lead role, who refused to take any salary for the film, in ode to his friendship with Rangarajan. Following his film career, Rangarajan worked on the television series Raghuvamsam and also made a telefilm for Singaporean producers.

Owing to his association with Kamal Haasan, Rangarajan renamed his house as "Kamal Illam". His son, G. N. R. Kumaravelan, apprenticed with Kamal Haasan for films such as Sathi Leelavathi (1995) and Marudhanayagam, and then debuted as a director in the late 2000s.

Death 
Rangarajan died on 3 June 2021, aged 90, due to age-related ailments.

Partial filmography 
Films

Television
Raghuvamsam

References

External links 
 

1930 births
2021 deaths
20th-century Indian dramatists and playwrights
Film directors from Chennai
Film producers from Chennai
Place of birth missing
Screenwriters from Chennai
Tamil film directors
Tamil film producers
Tamil screenwriters